Jan Michels (born 8 September 1970) is a Dutch former professional footballer who played as a midfielder. His first professional club was PEC Zwolle in 1990. He later played with the Go Ahead Eagles, Motherwell in Scotland, Sparta Rotterdam, FC Den Bosch and AGOVV Apeldoorn.

Career
He played five years for FC Den Bosch, winning promotion to the Eredivisie three times – in the 1998–99, 2000–01 and 2003–04 seasons. After playing two seasons with Excelsior '31, Michels announced his retirement from professional football in July 2010.

After his playing career, he started a construction company. Ahead of the 2020–21 season, he was appointed assistant coach of lower league club CSV Apeldoorn.

Honours
Den Bosch
 Eerste Divisie: 1998–99, 2000–01, 2003–04

References

1970 births
Living people
Dutch footballers
Dutch expatriate footballers
AGOVV Apeldoorn players
Sparta Rotterdam players
FC Den Bosch players
PEC Zwolle players
Motherwell F.C. players
Go Ahead Eagles players
Excelsior '31 players
Scottish Premier League players
Eredivisie players
Eerste Divisie players
Expatriate footballers in Scotland
Dutch expatriate sportspeople in Scotland
Footballers from Deventer
Association football midfielders